Moorland is a small town in Webster County, Iowa, United States. The population was 168 at the time of the 2020 census.

Geography
Moorland is located at  (42.442108, -94.293661).

Demographics

2010 census
As of the census of 2010, there were 169 people, 77 households, and 50 families living in the city. The racial makeup of the city was 99.4% White and 0.6% from two or more races. Hispanic or Latino of any race were 1.8% of the population.

There were 77 households, of which 24.7% had children under the age of 18 living with them, 45.5% were married couples living together, 7.8% had a female householder with no husband present, 11.7% had a male householder with no wife present, and 35.1% were non-families. 33.8% of all households were made up of individuals, and 10.4% had someone living alone who was 65 years of age or older. The average household size was 2.19 and the average family size was 2.74.

The median age in the city was 46.1 years. 19.5% of residents were under the age of 18; 8.8% were between the ages of 18 and 24; 20.7% were from 25 to 44; 34.3% were from 45 to 64; and 16.6% were 65 years of age or older. The gender makeup of the city was 53.3% male and 46.7% female.

2000 census
As of the census of 2000, there were 197 people, 81 households, and 57 families living in the city. The racial makeup of the city was 98.48% White, 0.51% from other races, and 1.02% from two or more races. Hispanic or Latino of any race were 2.03% of the population.

There were 81 households, out of which 30.9% had children under the age of 18 living with them, 58.0% were married couples living together, 7.4% had a female householder with no husband present, and 29.6% were non-families. 27.2% of all households were made up of individuals, and 11.1% had someone living alone who was 65 years of age or older. The average household size was 2.43 and the average family size was 2.84.

In the city, the population was spread out, with 25.9% under the age of 18, 9.1% from 18 to 24, 24.4% from 25 to 44, 27.4% from 45 to 64, and 13.2% who were 65 years of age or older. The median age was 39 years. For every 100 females, there were 93.1 males. For every 100 females age 18 and over, there were 94.7 males.

The median income for a household in the city was $43,750, and the median income for a family was $51,875. Males had a median income of $32,188 versus $25,417 for females. The per capita income for the city was $16,051. About 3.7% of families and 6.6% of the population were below the poverty line, including 9.8% of those under the age of eighteen and 8.3% of those 65 or over.

Education
Moorland is served by the Prairie Valley Community School District, which formed on July 1, 1993 with the merger of the Cedar Valley Community School District and the Prairie Community School District.

Government Buildings
The current post office, built in 1991 under President George H. W. Bush, is the only federal government building.

References

Cities in Iowa
Cities in Webster County, Iowa